, also known as , is a temple in Naruto, Tokushima Prefecture, Japan. It is the oku-no-in of Ryōzen-ji, Temple 1 on the Shikoku 88 temple pilgrimage. Said to have been founded by Gyōki, the main image is of Yakushi Nyorai. It is Temple 1 on the Shinshikoku Mandala Reijō. A Heian period seated wooden statue of Miroku Bosatsu has been designated an Important Cultural Property.

See also

 Ryōzen-ji

References

Buddhist temples in Tokushima Prefecture
Kōyasan Shingon temples
Naruto, Tokushima